HMS Redoubt was an R-class destroyer built for the Royal Navy during the Second World War.

Description
She was powered by two Parsons geared steam turbines, each driving one propeller shaft, using steam provided by two Admiralty three-drum boilers. Her complement was 176 officers and ratings.

The ship was armed with four 45-calibre 4.7-inch (120 mm) Mark IX guns in single mounts. For anti-aircraft (AA) defence, Redoubt had one quadruple mount for QF 2-pdr Mark VIII ("pom-pom") guns and six single  Oerlikon autocannon. She was fitted with two above-water quadruple mounts for  torpedoes. Two depth charge rails and four throwers were fitted for which 70 depth charges were provided.

Construction and career
HMS Redoubt was built by Clydebank and launched in 1942.

Postwar service
Between 1946 and 1947 Redoubt was part of the reserve held at Chatham Dockyard, being transferred to the Harwich reserve in August 1947. Between 1948 and 1949 she underwent a refit at Chatham Dockyard. She was transferred to India 4 July 1949, where she was commissioned as INS Ranjit and allocated the pennant number D209.

In 1953 she took part in the Fleet Review to celebrate the Coronation of Queen Elizabeth II Along with two other former R-class destroyers (Rajput and Rana) she formed part of the 11th destroyer Squadron. She served until 1979, and was scrapped after decommissioning.

References

Bibliography
 
 
 
 
 
 
 
 

 

Q and R-class destroyers of the Royal Navy
Ships built on the River Clyde
1942 ships
World War II destroyers of the United Kingdom
R-class destroyers of the Indian Navy